Lygropia holoxanthalis is a moth in the family Crambidae. It was described by William Jacob Holland in 1900. It is found in Buru, Indonesia .

References

Moths described in 1900
Lygropia